Symphyotrichum schaffneri (formerly Aster schaffneri) is a perennial, herbaceous species of flowering plant in the family Asteraceae native to the states of Puebla and Veracruz, Mexico.

Description
Branching occurs in the upper portions at 15–45° angles that ascend or sometimes arch if long enough.

Leaves
The leaves have a prominent middle vein with fine, reticulate veins surrounding it. They are hairless on top with soft hairs on the back sides, usually just on the midvein or scattered. Leaves clasp the stem up to halfway around it.

Flowers
On the outside the flower heads of all members of the family Asteraceae are small bracts that look like scales. These are called phyllaries, and together they form the involucre that protects the individual flowers in the head before they open. There are 25–45 phyllaries in about four graduated series with the inner phyllaries about two to three times longer than the outer phyllaries. There are 17–24 white ray florets length  (sometimes up to ) long, with 11–26 yellow then pink disk florets.

Taxonomy
The species was formally described in 1986 as Aster schaffneri  by American botanists Scott D. Sundberg and Almut Gitter Jones. The specimens analyzed had been collected in 1855, stored, and labeled "Aster schaffneri Schultz-Bip." but were concluded by Sundberg and Jones never to have been formally described. It had been named for J.G. Schaffner, German plant collector and pharmacist Johann Wilhelm Schaffner, later known as J.Guillermo Schaffner.

Notes

Citations

References

schaffneri
Flora of Mexico
Plants described in 1986
Taxa named by Scott D. Sundberg
Taxa named by Almut Gitter Jones